Rafael Palacios may refer to:

Rafael Palacios (priest), Roman Catholic El Salvadoran priest 
Rafael Palacios (artist), Puerto Rican-American artist and mapmaker